The 2012–13 Riksserien season was the highest tier of women's ice hockey in Sweden.  Eight teams competed in the league, with the top six participating in the 2013 Swedish Championship playoffs in women's ice hockey.  MODO finished first in the regular season, but were eliminated in the semifinals by Brynäs IF, who would lose in the finals to AIK. The bottom two teams were forced to participate in a qualifier to keep their spots in the league, which resulted in HV71 being demoted to the second-tier league, Division 1.

Regular season

Standings

Swedish Championship playoffs

2013 Riksserien qualifier
The Riksserien qualifier was contested by the two teams with the best records from the 2012–13 Allettan season and the two teams with the worst records from the 2012–13 Riksserien.  The teams played a single round robin tournament with one game between each team.  The two team with the best records were qualified for play in the 2013–14 Riksserien season.

IF Sundsvall finished second, and thereby replaced third-placed HV71 in Svenska Serien.

External links
 Official Statistics from Swedish Ice Hockey Federation

Women
Swedish Women's Hockey League seasons
Sweden
2012 in Swedish women's sport
2013 in Swedish women's sport